In Greek mythology, Proclia or Proclea (Ancient Greek: Πρόκλεια Prókleia) is the daughter of Laomedon, king of Troy, or Clytius, son of Laomedon (and in the latter case sister of Caletor). She married Cycnus, king of Colonae, and bore him two children, Tenes and Hemithea. Tenes, however is said to be the son of Apollo.

Notes

References 

 Apollodorus, The Library with an English Translation by Sir James George Frazer, F.B.A., F.R.S. in 2 Volumes, Cambridge, MA, Harvard University Press; London, William Heinemann Ltd. 1921. ISBN 0-674-99135-4. Online version at the Perseus Digital Library. Greek text available from the same website.
 Pausanias, Description of Greece with an English Translation by W.H.S. Jones, Litt.D., and H.A. Ormerod, M.A., in 4 Volumes. Cambridge, MA, Harvard University Press; London, William Heinemann Ltd. 1918. . Online version at the Perseus Digital Library
 Pausanias, Graeciae Descriptio. 3 vols. Leipzig, Teubner. 1903.  Greek text available at the Perseus Digital Library.

Women of the Trojan war
Women of Apollo
Trojans